Abdullah Jaroudi Jr. (born 18 March 1938) is a Lebanese former sports shooter. He competed in the 50 metre rifle, prone event at the 1960 Summer Olympics. His father, Abdullah Jaroudi Sr., competed at the 1952 Summer Olympics.

References

1938 births
Living people
Lebanese male sport shooters
Olympic shooters of Lebanon
Shooters at the 1960 Summer Olympics
Sportspeople from Beirut